Heather Clare Knight  (born 26 December 1990) is an English cricketer who is captain of the England women's cricket team. She is a right-handed batter and right arm off spin bowler. Knight played in her 100th Women's One Day International match for England in December 2019.

Early life
Knight was born on 26 December 1990 in Rochdale and was educated at Plymstock School, a state secondary school in Plymouth, Devon. She was offered a place at the University of Cambridge to study natural sciences, but turned it down so that she would have the time to play cricket. She went on to study Biomedical Sciences at Cardiff University.

Domestic career
Knight played club cricket for Plymstock Cricket Club in the Devon Cricket League. She started attending colts training sessions at 8 years old and progressed through the club's youth system.

Knight is a prolific batter at county level, initially for her home county of Devon and currently for Berkshire. She topped the county run scoring aggregates in both 2008 (390 runs) and 2009 (622). She also played for the Diamonds, Sapphires and Emeralds in the Super Fours.

Knight captained Western Storm in the now-defunct Women's Cricket Super League, leading them to the title in 2017 and 2019. She was the competition's leading run-scorer across its four seasons. She continued to play for Western Storm in the Rachael Heyhoe Flint Trophy in 2020.

Knight has played domestically in Australia, previously for Tasmanian Roar and Hobart Hurricanes and currently for Sydney Thunder. She won the Women's Big Bash League in her first season with the Thunder, top-scoring with 26* in the final. In 2021, she was drafted by London Spirit for the inaugural season of The Hundred. In April 2022, she was bought by the London Spirit for the 2022 season of The Hundred.

In the inaugural season of the Women's Premier League in 2023, Knight was bought by Royal Challengers Bangalore (RCB) at the price of 40 Lakhs.

International career
Knight was called into the England squad on their tour of India in 2010 as a replacement for the injured Sarah Taylor and played in the 5th One Day International on 1 March in Mumbai, opening the batting and scoring 49 on her international debut. She toured Sri Lanka with the England team in 2010, making her Twenty20 debut in the 2nd match of the series on 22 November in Colombo. She made her test debut in the one-off Ashes test at Sydney's Bankstown Oval in January 2011.

She is the holder of one of the first tranche of 18 ECB central contracts for women players, which were announced in April 2014.

On 5 June 2016, Knight was appointed captain of the England women's cricket team after Charlotte Edwards stood down.

She also became the first female cricketer to score a fifty and to take a five wicket haul in an ODI innings.

2017 Women's Cricket World Cup
Heather Knight led the England team in her first Women's Cricket World Cup as captain, and they won the tournament despite losing to India in the opening match. In the second group match against Pakistan she, along with Natalie Sciver, went on to put on a record 3rd-wicket partnership in the history of Women's Cricket World Cup (213) as England managed to defeat Pakistan convincingly by 107 runs. In the final at Lord's Knight led England to a 9 run victory over India.

Following the team's success, she was awarded an OBE in the Queen's 2018 New Year Honours list.

In April 2018 she was named one of the five Wisden Cricketers of the Year for her part in the 2017 World Cup victory.

2018 World Twenty20 and beyond

In October 2018, she was named as the captain of England's squad for the 2018 ICC Women's World Twenty20 tournament in the West Indies.

In February 2019, she was awarded a full central contract by the England and Wales Cricket Board (ECB) for 2019. In June 2019, the ECB named her in England's squad for their opening match against Australia to contest the Women's Ashes.

On 12 December 2019, during England's series against Pakistan in Malaysia, Knight became the tenth woman for England to play in 100 WODI matches.

In January 2020, Knight was named as the captain of England's squad for the 2020 ICC Women's T20 World Cup in Australia. In England's second match of the tournament, against Thailand, Knight scored her 1,000th run in WT20Is. She also scored her first century in WT20I cricket, and became the first cricketer to score a century in all three formats of women's international cricket.

On 18 June 2020, Knight was named in a squad of 24 players to begin training ahead of international women's fixtures starting in England following the COVID-19 pandemic. In June 2021, Knight was named as the captain of England's Test squad for their one-off match against India. On 3 July 2021, in the home series against India, Knight scored her 3,000th run and took her 50th wicket in WODI cricket. In December 2021, Knight was named as the captain of England's squad for their tour to Australia to contest the Women's Ashes. In February 2022, she was named as the captain of England's team for the 2022 Women's Cricket World Cup in New Zealand. In July 2022, she was named as the captain of England's team for the cricket tournament at the 2022 Commonwealth Games in Birmingham, England.

International centuries

Overview
Knight was the first woman, and also the first England player, to score an international century in all three formats of the game. Her international centuries are:

Test centuries

One Day International centuries

T20 International centuries

Personal life
Knight's nickname is "Trev". In 2015, she explained to sports journalist Clare Balding that "When I was about 13 and introduced myself at cricket camp, they thought I said Trevor rather than Heather!"

Knight also has a partner, Tim, who is an accountant.

References

External links

 
 
 

1990 births
Living people
Berkshire women cricketers
Devon women cricketers
England women Test cricketers
England women One Day International cricketers
England women Twenty20 International cricketers
Hobart Hurricanes (WBBL) cricketers
Officers of the Order of the British Empire
Tasmanian Tigers (women's cricket) cricketers
Western Storm cricketers
Wisden Cricketers of the Year
Sydney Thunder (WBBL) cricketers
London Spirit cricketers
Royal Challengers Bangalore (WPL) cricketers
Cricketers at the 2022 Commonwealth Games
Commonwealth Games competitors for England